Theismann is a German surname. Notable people with the surname include the following:

 Dirk Theismann (born 1963), German former water polo player
 Joe Theismann (born 1949), American former football player

See also
 Thomas Theisman, a fictional character in David Weber's Honorverse series
 Manfred Thiesmann, a former German Olympic swimming coach

German-language surnames